Fra Antun Knežević (9 January 1834 – 22 September 1889) was a Bosnian Franciscan friar, historian and writer from Varcar Vakuf, Bosnia and Herzegovina. He was a staunch proponent of Bosniak national identity, while being an active member of the Illyrian Movement.

Early life and education
Born in Varcar Vakuf (today Mrkonjić Grad) in 1834, his father Anto came from the town of Uskoplje, and his mother was Agata Stipić (née Ivekić) from Varcar Vakuf. His father died early and he was raised by his uncle from his father's side, Fra Grgo Knežević, who was buried in Ivanjska village.

Fra Antun Knežević studied in Fojnica, Rome, and Siena and became friar on 26 April 1851. His first Mass was on 21 September 1856.

Views, opinions and engagements
Antun Knežević was one of the main proponents of Bosniak nationhood, and he fiercely advocated against imminent Croatization of Bosnian Catholics on one side, as well as imminent Serbianization of Bosnian Orthodox people on the other, as he called them Catholic Bosniaks and Orthodox Bosniaks in his work. His position and doctrine was that all Bosnians or Bosniaks are one people of three faiths, and that up to the late 19th century no Croats and Serbs lived in Bosnia and Herzegovina. Although Fra Antun Knežević was not a unique phenomenon in this sense, he was certainly among the most articulate, having a strong impact along with Fra Ivan Franjo Jukić from whom he took the idea, and who was his teacher and mentor earlier in his life. Since the 17th century many other members of Franciscan order in Bosnia accepted the idea of a Bosniak identity, nurturing it within the brotherhood and carrying it over into the 18th and 19th century. But it was these two, Fra Knežević and his mentor, Fra Jukič, who left the deepest mark on Bosnian culture and history, while championing the notion that Catholics, Orthodox and Muslims are one nation, and Bosnia and Herzegovina a country with deep cultural and historical roots. Like Jukić before him, Knežević too articulately expressed his feeling of national belonging, which he always and primarily defined as Bošnjak (Bosniak) in such a way as to include all three religious groups inhabiting Bosnia and Herzegovina. The only other cultural identity he recognized was Illyrian, as a cultural supra-identity of all South Slavs, on which all his interest and activity as a member of the Illyrian movement was based. He was a great opponent of any foreign occupation of Bosnia and Herzegovina, which during his lifetime meant occupation by the Ottomans and transition of it authority and jurisdictions to the Austro-Hungarian Empire in 1878. 

Fra Antun Knezević in 1877 started the construction of the Franciscan monastery in Jajce (without permission). He also opened the first public school in Bosnia in his own house.

Service
curate and teacher in Varcar Vakuf (Mrkonjić Grad) 1857
curate in Bugojno 1858
curate in Varcar Vakuf 1864
tutor and professor at Franciscan Youth in Livno 1861 - 1864
lector of theology in Guča Gora 1864
vicar in Dobretićimi 1868
spiritual leader of youth in Đakovo 1868
vicar in Varcar Vakuf 1873
vicar in Ivanjska 1873
vicar in newly built monastery in Petrićevac 1875
vicar in Jajce 1876 - 1879
started the groundwork and laid the foundation for the monastery in Jajce 1882, officially opened 1886
vicar in Liskovica 1884 – 1886
vicar in Kotor Varoš 1889

Death
Knežević died on 22 September 1889 in Kotor Varoš while celebrating a folk Mass. His bones were transferred to Jajce in 1955. Later friars of Jajce monastery moved the bones of Fra Antun Knežević to the nearby, new church of the Assumption of the Blessed Virgin Mary in Jajce.

Bibliography
"Rieč popa Gojka Miroševića svojem Bošnjakom i Hercegovcem"
"Rieč Hodže bosanskog Hadži Muje Mejovića"
"Mladić bosanski proviđen u svojoj učionici za prvu godinu"
"Rieč hodže Petrovačkog bratiji Turcima"
"Suze bošnjaka nad grobnicom kralja svoga u Jajcu"
"Krvava knjiga"
"Opet o grobu bosanskom"
"Kratka povjest kralja bosanski"
"Pad Bosne"
"Carsko - turski namjesnici u Bosni i Hercegovini"
"Povjesnica novoimenovanog Franjevačkog samostana u Jajcu I-III"
"Varica"

Letters
Letter to Kallay, Bosnian historian fra. Antun Knežević's letter to Béni Kállay (pdf)

See also
Franciscan Province of Bosna Srebrena

References

1834 births
1889 deaths
19th-century Bosnia and Herzegovina historians
19th-century Bosnia and Herzegovina Roman Catholic priests
Franciscans of the Franciscan Province of Bosnia
Bosnia and Herzegovina essayists
Historians of Bosnia and Herzegovina
Cultural history of Bosnia and Herzegovina